Arvīds Ozols-Bernē (born 25 June 1888, date of death unknown) was a Latvian athlete. He competed in the men's shot put at the 1912 Summer Olympics for the Russian Empire.

References

1888 births
Year of death missing
Athletes (track and field) at the 1912 Summer Olympics
Latvian male shot putters
Olympic competitors for the Russian Empire
Place of birth missing